Intermission is a compilation album by power metal band Stratovarius, released on 26 June 2001 through Nuclear Blast. The album consists of covers, live and bonus tracks, as well as four new tracks. It charted in the top 100 in four countries.

Critical reception

Antti J. Ravelin at AllMusic gave Intermission three stars out of five, calling it "just an attempt to please fans and to postpone the making of their next studio album", but that "oddly enough, Intermission succeeds to offer a very album-like (a strong and steady whole) compilation."

Track listing

Personnel
Timo Kotipelto – lead vocals (except track 6)
Timo Tolkki – lead vocals (track 6), guitar, record producer
Jens Johansson – keyboards
Jörg Michael – drums
Jari Kainulainen – bass guitar
Kimmo – background vocals
Marko – background vocals
Pasi – background vocals
Anssi – background vocals
Mikko Karmila – engineering (except track 12), mixing
T. T. Oksala – engineering (track 12)
Mika Jussila – mastering

Chart performance

References

External links
Intermission at stratovarius.com

Stratovarius compilation albums
2001 compilation albums
Nuclear Blast compilation albums